Gavin Howard Thorley (11 June 1947 – 3 July 2022) was a New Zealand long-distance runner. He competed in the men's 5000 metres at the 1972 Summer Olympics. Later in life he was very active as a volunteer with Special Olympics Kapiti.

References

External links
 

1947 births
2022 deaths
Athletes (track and field) at the 1972 Summer Olympics
New Zealand male long-distance runners
Olympic athletes of New Zealand
Athletes from Wellington City